Byer is a surname. Notable people with the surname include:

 Ben Byer, American stage actor and playwright
 Tom Byer, American professional soccer player
 Paul Byer, InterVarsity staff worker 
 George Byer, American politician
 Nicole Byer, American comedian, actress, writer, and television host
 Renée C. Byer, American photojournalist 
 Robert L. Byer, American physicist
 Aram Byer James, Santa Clara County, CA Assistant Public Defender, police watchdog, social activist, and civil rights attorney
 Esther Byer-Suckoo, Barbadian physician and politician
 Kathryn Stripling Byer, American poet and teacher

See also 
 Byer, Ohio, unincorporated community in Ohio, United States
 Byer Covered Bridge, covered bridge in United States
 Kleiner Perkins Caufield Byer, American venture capital firm

 Byers (surname)